This article shows all participating team squads at the 2009 FIVB Women's World Grand Champions Cup, held from November 10 to November 15, 2009 in Tokyo and Fukuoka, Japan.

Head coach: José Roberto Guimarães

Head coach: Marcos Kwiek

Head coach: Massimo Barbolini

Head coach: Masayoshi Manabe

Head coach: Hoa-suk Ryu

Head coach: Kiattipong Radchatagriengkai

References
 Official site

G
G